The Oman Super Cup is an Omani football cup competition. It was first held in 1999, but has been played on and off since its inception. It is the curtain raiser to the Omani football season. It pairs the previous season's Sultan Qaboos Cup winners against the Oman Professional League champions.

Championship history

Year by year

Performance by club

Cities
The following table lists the Oman Super Cup champions by cities.

Controversies
The 2015 Oman Super Cup was a subject of controversy as on 19 August 2015, the defending Oman Professional League
and Sultan Qaboos Cup champions, Al-Oruba SC decided to pull out of the 2015 Oman Super Cup, citing non-payment of dues by the Oman Football Association and a late release of its players from national and army team camps as the main reasons behind the club's decision to pull out. On 21 August 2015, Fanja was declared the winner of the Super Cup after its opponent, Al-Oruba, as expected failed to turn up for the match.

See also

 Oman Professional League
 Sultan Qaboos Cup
 Oman Professional League Cup

References

External links
Oman Super Cup – SOCCERWAY

3